Henry James Harvey Slade (born 19 March 1993) is an English professional rugby union player. He plays for the Exeter Chiefs in Premiership Rugby and represents England at international level. His primary position is centre but he has also played at fly-half and full-back.

Education
Slade attended Plymouth College and then University of Exeter reading for a BSc in Sports & Exercise Science.

Club career
Slade plays for Exeter Chiefs in the English Premiership. He was dual-registered to Exeter and Plymouth Albion during the 2011–2012 season. On 13 April 2013 Slade made his Premiership debut against London Irish coming off the bench to replace Gareth Steenson, Slade scored his first premiership points in this game kicking over a conversion following a try from Dave Ewers. The following season saw Slade start for the side that beat Northampton Saints in the 2014 Anglo-Welsh Cup final to win Exeter their first major trophy in their history.

In May 2017 Slade came off the bench for the Exeter side that defeated Wasps in the Premiership final to become champions of England for the first time in their history. Slade scored a try in the 2020 European Rugby Champions Cup Final as Exeter defeated Racing to become champions of Europe for the first time. The following weekend saw Slade awarded the player of the match award as he scored another try to help the Chiefs overcome Wasps in the Premiership final completing a league and European double.

International career
On 22 July 2010 Slade made his debut for the England under-18 team. England Academy coach John Fletcher once said of Slade "the way he plays reminds me of a young Toby Flood or Rory Clegg." Slade was a member of the England under-20 team that won consecutive titles in the 2012 and 2013 U20 Six Nations. He started for the side that defeated Wales in the final of the 2013 IRB Junior World Championship to become youth world champions for the first time. In January 2014 Slade made his debut at England 'A' level against Ireland Wolfhounds.

In June 2014 Slade scored fifteen points for England in an uncapped game against the Barbarian at Twickenham. He was included in the preliminary training squad by coach Stuart Lancaster for the 2015 Rugby World Cup and on 15 August 2015 won his first cap for England, partnering Sam Burgess in midfield during a warm-up victory over France. He was selected for the World Cup and scored his first international try on his only appearance during the tournament in their final pool game against Uruguay.

A broken leg suffered playing for Exeter in December 2015 meant Slade did not feature for new coach Eddie Jones until the 2016 autumn internationals against Fiji and Argentina. He made his first Six Nations appearance against Italy during the 2017 tournament which England retained. He started both tests on their 2017 tour of Argentina and later that year scored his second international try against Samoa. Slade was selected for the 2018 autumn International Series, and played in all four Test matches.

Slade scored tries against Ireland and France during the 2019 Six Nations Championship. He was included in the squad for the 2019 Rugby World Cup and featured in the quarter-final and semi-final victories over Australia and New Zealand. In the 2019 Rugby World Cup Final he came off the bench during the second half to replace George Ford as England were defeated by South Africa to finish runners up.

Slade scored a try in the final round of the 2020 Six Nations Championship as England beat Italy to win the tournament. Later that year he scored a try in an Autumn Nations Cup match against Wales and then started in the final of the competition as England defeated France in extra-time to lift the trophy.

In 2021 Slade failed to be selected for the British and Irish Lions tour to South Africa.

International appearances

International tries

Personal life
Slade's mother is Jayne and he is the oldest of three boys, his brother Seb (b.1995) is an actor, the youngest, Albert (b.2000), is a rugby player and student.
Slade has Type 1 diabetes, and often injects insulin at half-time in a game.

Slade is the great nephew of former Portsmouth F.C. footballer Geoff Williamson.

In March 2020, Slade and his wife, Megan, announced that they were expecting their first child. On 14 August 2020,  Megan gave birth to a daughter, Olive Margot Slade.

Slade has been criticised for comments he made in an interview in May 2021 where he stated that he would not take a vaccine for COVID-19. He has since made a statement through his club clarifying that his remarks were not to be taken as opposition to the Government's vaccine roll-out.

Honours
England
 Six Nations Championship: 2017, 2020
 Autumn Nations Cup: 2020
 Rugby World Cup runner-up: 2019

Exeter
 European Rugby Champions Cup: 2019–2020
 Premiership: 2016–17, 2019–20 
 Anglo-Welsh Cup: 2013–14

References

External links

Exeter Chiefs Profile
RFU Player Profile

1993 births
Living people
England international rugby union players
English rugby union players
Exeter Chiefs players
People educated at Plymouth College
People with type 1 diabetes
Plymouth Albion R.F.C. players
Rugby union players from Plymouth, Devon
Rugby union centres